The Creole Queen is a 1,000-passenger paddlewheel riverboat operating out of the Port of New Orleans. She is operated by New Orleans Paddlewheels, Inc. She was built by Halter Marine at Moss Point, Mississippi along the lines of a turn-of-the-century sternwheeler and was christened into service in September 1983. She has three decks, two of which house three dining and banquet rooms and a third top deck for covered outside seating. Her gross tonnage is 397. She is docked at the Poydras Street dock adjacent to the Riverwalk and New Orleans Hilton Riverside and Towers. Her master is Captain Brian Clesi.

External links

Creole Queen official website

Paddle steamers of the United States
Ships built in Moss Point, Mississippi
1983 ships